Roy Johnson may refer to:

Sport
Roy Johnson (footballer) (1891–1962), Australian rules footballer
Roy W. Johnson (coach) (1892–1989), American coach, athletic director, and faculty member of the University of New Mexico
Roy Johnson (pitcher) (1895–1986), American baseball pitcher and coach
Roy Johnson (1930s outfielder) (1903–1973), American baseball player
Roy Johnson (boxer) (born 1948), Bermudian boxer
Roy Johnson (1980s outfielder) (1959–2009), American baseball player
Roy Johnson (trainer), thoroughbred trainer in the Canadian Horse Racing Hall of Fame

Others
Roy W. Johnson (politician) (1882–1947), Lieutenant Governor of Nebraska from 1943 to 1947
Roy P. Johnson (died 1963), American Associated Press telegrapher assigned to the Fargo Forum who published an extensive series of regional history articles
Roy L. Johnson (1906–1999), American admiral and commander in chief of the United States Pacific Fleet
Roy Lee Johnson (born 1938), American R&B and soul songwriter, singer and guitarist
Roydel Johnson (born 1943), Jamaican musician, also known as Congo Ashanti Roy

See also
Roy Johnston (born 1929), Irish physicist